Mark Matthiesen is an American politician from the state of Missouri. A Republican, he was elected in November 2016 from the 70th district of the Missouri House of Representatives, served from January 2017 to January 2019, then was elected in November 2022 from the 103rd district. The 70th district included parts of Saint Charles and Saint Louis counties, spanning between Chesterfield and Florissant. In 2018, Matthiesen lost re-election to Democratic candidate Paula Brown by less than a one percent margin and only 111 votes, with nearly 200 votes going to a third-party candidate. In 2022, he was elected from another St. Charles county district, that includes much of the city of O'Fallon. Matthiesen previously worked in the hospitality industry for 20 years.

Election results

References

21st-century American politicians
Living people
Missouri State University alumni
People from St. Louis County, Missouri
Politicians from Fayetteville, Arkansas
Republican Party members of the Missouri House of Representatives
Year of birth missing (living people)